Lee Sun-hee (born November 11, 1964) is a South Korean singer-songwriter. She is often referred to as Korea's "National Diva" for her immense popularity, commercial success, and vocal ability. 

Lee debuted in 1984 with the song, "To J," for which she won first prize in the MBC Riverside Song Festival. She released her first album, Ah! The Good Old Days, the following year in 1985. She released a string of successful albums in the 1980s and early 1990s, and won awards at KBS Song Festival and MBC Ten Singers Song Festival every year from 1984 to 1990, as well as main prize at the Golden Disc Awards every year from 1986 to 1990.

The government of South Korea awarded Lee the prestigious Prime Minister's Commendation in 2010 for her contributions to popular culture. In 2011, Lee became the fourth South Korean singer to ever perform at Carnegie Hall. She released her 15th album, Serendipity in 2014. In 2018, she performed in Pyongyang as a part of Spring is Coming and became one of few South Korean singers to perform twice in North Korea. She released her 16th album, Anbu in 2020.

Biography
Lee Sun-hee was born in 1964 in Boryeong, South Chungcheong Province, South Korea. She was raised near a secluded Buddhist temple by her mother and her father, a Buddhist monk who belongs to a sect of the religion that allows monks to marry and have children. She attended Sangmyung High School and graduated from Incheon City College in 1984 with a degree in environmental management.

While she was a student at Incheon City College, Lee participated in the 5th MBC Riverside Song Festival as a member of the singing duo Act 4 Scene 5 with fellow student Im Sung-kyun. They won the grand prize with the song, "To J", which became a hit, garnering Lee prizes for best new artist at the year-end KBS Music Awards and MBC Top 10 Singers Song Festival. Her signature boyish look was also a hit, causing a so-called "Lee Sun-hee syndrome," or craze, among female students who imitated her short haircut and round glasses.

Musical style
Lee Sun-hee possesses a warm, lyric soprano voice with sturdy lows and bombastic highs. In addition to being a vocalist, Lee Sun-hee is also a songwriter, writing many of the songs on her later albums including the celebrated hit 'Fate'. During her 30th anniversary concert tour, Sun-hee broadcast a clip during the intermission revealing her three biggest musical influences: Barbra Streisand, Madonna, and Whitney Houston. She has mentioned Korean vocalist Song Chang-sik as one of her influences and role models.

Discography

Studio albums

Collaborations

OST albums
 KBS drama 《Fireworks》 released in 1984
 MBC animation 《The Little Princess Sara》 released in 1986
 MBC drama 《Blue Classroom》 released in 1987
 KBS animation 《Run Hani》 released in 1988
KBS animation 《Reckless Hani》 released in 1989
 SBS drama 《Fear With No Love》 released in 1992
MBC drama 《Gips Family》 released in 2000
 Movie 《The Beauty In Dream》 released in 2002
 Movie 《King And The Clown》 released in 2005
 Movie 《The Sword with No Name》 released in 2009
 SBS drama 《My Girlfriend Is a Gumiho》 released in 2010
 SBS drama 《Big Thing (TV series)》 released in 2010
 SBS drama 《The Legend of the Blue Sea》 released in 2016
 MBC drama 《The Red Sleeve》 released in 2021

Filmography

Television shows

Awards

Awards and nominations

State honors

Notes

References

External links
 

1964 births
Living people
South Korean women pop singers
People from Boryeong
20th-century South Korean women singers
21st-century South Korean women singers
South Korean Buddhists
South Korean sopranos